Gordon William Livsey (born 24 January 1947) is an English former professional footballer who played as a goalkeeper in the Football League for Wrexham, Chester and Hartlepool United.

References

1947 births
Living people
Sportspeople from Keighley
Association football goalkeepers
English footballers
Kettering Town F.C. players
Wrexham A.F.C. players
Chester City F.C. players
Hartlepool United F.C. players
Weymouth F.C. players
English Football League players
English football managers
Corby Town F.C. managers